Linda Monsen Merkesdal (born 12 April 1973) is a Norwegian politician.

She was elected representative to the Storting from the constituency of Hordaland for the period 2021–2025, for the Labour Party. She was deputy representative to the Storting 2017–2021.

References

1973 births
Living people
Labour Party (Norway) politicians
Hordaland politicians
Members of the Storting
Women members of the Storting